Muraki may refer to:

Muraki, Fars, a village in Iran
Muraki (surname), a Japanese surname

See also
 Meraki (disambiguation)